The Committee of Five of the Second Continental Congress was a group of five members who drafted and presented to the full Congress in Pennsylvania State House what would become the United States Declaration of Independence of July 4, 1776. This Declaration committee operated from June 11, 1776, until July 5, 1776, the day on which the Declaration was published.

The Committee was composed of John Adams, Benjamin Franklin, Thomas Jefferson, Robert Livingston, and Roger Sherman.

The Committee of Five 
The members of this committee were:
 John Adams, representative of Massachusetts, who later became the second president of the United States
 Thomas Jefferson, representative of Virginia, who later became the third president of the United States
 Benjamin Franklin, representative of Pennsylvania, known as one of the most famous intellectuals among the Founding Fathers, whose academic writings and press publications had a very significant influence in the American Revolution, the only person to sign the Declaration of Independence, Treaty of Alliance with France, Treaty of Paris, and U.S. Constitution 
 Roger Sherman, representative of Connecticut, the only person to sign all four of the U.S. state papers: the Continental Association, the Declaration, the Articles of Confederation, and the Constitution
 Robert Livingston, representative of New York, who later served as the  first United States Secretary of Foreign Affairs, administered the presidential oath of office at the First inauguration of George Washington and negotiated the Louisiana Purchase as the minister to France.

Drafting of the Declaration of Independence 

The delegates of the Thirteen Colonies in Congress resolved to postpone until Monday, July 1, the final consideration of whether or not to declare the several sovereign independencies of the Colonies, which had been proposed by the North Carolina resolutions of April 12 and the Virginia resolutions of May 15. The proposal, known as the Lee Resolution, was moved in Congress on June 7 by Richard Henry Lee of Virginia. During these allotted three weeks Congress agreed to appoint a committee to draft a statement to outline the reasons for the Colonies seceding from the British Empire. The actual declaration of "American Independence" is precisely the text comprising the final paragraph of the published broadside of July 4. The broadside's final paragraph repeated the text of the Lee Resolution as adopted by the declaratory resolve voted on July 2.

On June 11, the Committee of Five was appointed: John Adams of Massachusetts, Roger Sherman of Connecticut, Robert Livingston of New York, Benjamin Franklin of Pennsylvania, and Thomas Jefferson of Virginia. Because the committee left no minutes, there is some uncertainty about how the drafting process proceeded. Accounts written many years later by Jefferson and Adams, although frequently cited, vary in some respects.

The first draft 
After discussing the general outline that the document, the Second Continental Congress decided that Jefferson would write the first draft. Jefferson wrote the document between With Congress's busy schedule, Jefferson had limited time to write the draft over the ensuing 17 days. He then consulted with the others on the committee, who reviewed the draft and made extensive changes. Jefferson then produced another copy incorporating these alterations.

Among the changes was the simplification of what Jefferson had termed "preservation of life, & liberty, & the pursuit of happiness" to the more succinct and sonorous phrase familiar to all today,  “Life, Liberty and the pursuit of Happiness”. This shares some similarities with, but is distinct from, John Locke's prior description of private property as a natural right, in the phrase "life, liberty, and estate".

Jefferson's first draft also considered a scathing criticism of Great Britain's use of slavery, which was later removed in order to avoid offending slaveholders.

Presentation of the draft 
On June 28, 1776, the committee presented this copy to the "Committee of the Whole" Congress, which was commemorated by Trumbull’s famed painting. The title of the document was "A Declaration by the Representatives of the United States of America, in General Congress assembled".

The signing 
Although not officially noted, the estimated time was 6:26 p.m. (18:26 LMT) for the recording of this historic vote. The Congress then heard the report of the Committee of the Whole and declared the sovereign status of the United Colonies the following day, during the afternoon of July 2.  The Committee of the Whole then turned to the Declaration, and it was given a second reading before adjournment.

Last minute arguments 
On Wednesday, July 3, the Committee of the Whole gave the Declaration the third reading and commenced scrutiny of the precise wording of the proposed text. But for two passages in the Committee of Five's draft that were rejected by the Committee of the Whole the work was accepted without any other major changes. One was a critical reference to the English people and the other was a  denunciation of the slave trade and of slavery itself.

Jefferson wrote in his autobiography, of the two deleted passages:

As John Adams recalled many years later, this work of editing the proposed text was largely completed by the time of adjournment on July 3. However, the text's formal adoption was deferred until the following morning, when the Congress voted its agreement during the late morning of July 4.

Fair copy 

The draft document as adopted was then referred back to the Committee of Five to prepare a "fair copy", this being the redrafted-as-corrected document prepared for delivery to the broadside printer, John Dunlap. And so the Committee of Five convened in the early evening of July 4 to complete its task.

Historians have had no documentary means by which to determine the identity of the authenticating party. It is unclear whether the Declaration was authenticated by the Committee of Five's signature, or the Committee submitted the fair copy to President Hancock for his authenticating signature, or the authentication awaited President John Hancock's signature on the printer's finished proof-copy of what became known as the Dunlap broadside. Either way, upon the July 5 release of the Dunlap Broadside of the Declaration, the Committee of Five's work was done.

The Dunlap broadside release to the public 
Upon the July 5 release of the Dunlap broadside, the public could read who had signed the Declaration. Hancock's signature, as President of the Continental Congress, appears on the broadside, as does that of Continental Congress Secretary Charles Thomson in an attest. Memories of the participants proved to be very short on this particular historic moment. Not three decades had elapsed by which time the prominent members of the Committee of Five could no longer recollect either detail of what had actually taken place, or their active participation, on July 4 and 5 of 1776. And so during these early decades was born the durable myth of one grand ceremonial general signing on July 4, by all the delegates to Congress.

See also
Founding Fathers of the United States
 Committee of Detail, drafted the United States Constitution

References

External links 
 Lee Resolution: "The Lee Resolution of June 7, 1776, born of the Virginia Resolve of May 15, 1776".
 Dunlap broadside: The Dunlap broadside of the Declaration of Independence, as first published on July 5, 1776, entitled "A DECLARATION By The Representatives of the UNITED STATES OF AMERICA In General Congress assembled".
 Goddard broadside: The Goddard broadside of the Declaration of Independence, as first published on January 31, 1777, entitled "The unanimous DECLARATION of the Thirteen United States of AMERICA".

Continental Congress
 United States Declaration of Independence
Committees
Thomas Jefferson
Benjamin Franklin
John Adams